Julius Nepos (died 9 May 480), or simply Nepos, ruled as Roman emperor of the West from 24 June 474 to 28 August 475. After losing power in Italy, Nepos retreated to his home province of Dalmatia, from which he continued to claim the western imperial title, with recognition from the Eastern Roman Empire, until he was murdered in 480. Though Nepos' successor in Italy, Romulus Augustulus (475–476), is traditionally deemed the last western Roman emperor, Nepos is regarded by some historians as the true last emperor of the west, being the last widely recognised claimant to the position.

After the death of the western emperor  Anthemius (467–472), who had been appointed by the eastern emperor Leo I (457–474), as well as Anthemius' successor Olybrius (472), Leo sought to assert his authority in the west, granting Nepos command of an army in December 473 to attack Italy and depose Glycerius (473–474), who had been proclaimed emperor by the Burgundian general Gundobad. Nepos left for Italy in the spring of 474, backed by Leo's successor Zeno, and landed with his army at Portus, near Rome. Nepos swiftly deposed Glycerius and was crowned western emperor in Rome on 24 June 474. He was the last emperor to be crowned in the city until Charlemagne in the ninth century. Whether the original intention of the invasion was to install Nepos as western emperor is unclear, but in any event, he was quickly recognised as the legitimate western emperor by Zeno.

Nepos worked to restore the prestige and authority of the Western Empire, though mostly unsuccessfully. He may have repelled a Visigothic attack on Italy and managed to once more reduce the Burgundians into foederati. Nepos focused most of his attention on reasserting imperial control and authority in Gaul, but the Western Empire could no longer project enough strength to halt Visigothic conquests in the region. The failure to defeat the Visigoths in Gaul, and Zeno's brief overthrowal in Constantinople by the usurper Basiliscus, weakened Nepos' already shaky position in Italy. In 475, Nepos' newly appointed magister militum Orestes revolted and marched on Ravenna, capital of the Western Empire. Unable to deal with Orestes' forces, Nepos fled back to Dalmatia and two months later, Orestes proclaimed his young son Romulus Augustulus as emperor.

Although no longer in control of Italy, Nepos never renounced his claim to the Western Empire and continued to be recognised as the legitimate western emperor by the Eastern Empire. In 476, the barbarian general Odoacer deposed Romulus Augustulus and became the first king of Italy. Nepos repeatedly petitioned Zeno, who by then had defeated Basiliscus, for help in regaining control of Italy, though all he achieved was nominal recognition by Odoacer, who minted coins in Nepos' name but otherwise mostly ignored him. In 480, Nepos was murdered by two of his generals, Ovida and Viator, perhaps in Diocletian's Palace, possibly while planning an expedition of his own to recover Italy.

Background

Geopolitical background 

The idea that the Roman Empire had grown too large to efficiently be managed by one emperor, and was more appropriately governed by two co-ruling emperors, had become established by the time of emperor Diocletian (284–305) in the late 3rd century. Throughout the 4th century, various different divisions were made until the empire was firmly and permanently divided into western and eastern spheres of imperial administration from the death of emperor Theodosius I (379–395) in 395 onwards. Though modern historians typically use the terms Western Roman Empire and Eastern Roman Empire to describe the new political situation, the Romans themselves never considered the empire to have been formally divided, still viewing it as a single unit, although most often having two rulers rather than one. The Western Roman Empire was more rural than the east, with fewer people and a less stable economy, and prone to an increasing number of Germanic barbarian invasions and settlements, experienced catastrophic decline throughout the 5th century. In 410, the Visigoths under Alaric I had sacked Rome and in 455, the last western emperor of the Theodosian dynasty, Valentinian III (425–455), was deposed and murdered. That same year, Rome was sacked again for the second time in less than fifty years, this time by the Vandals under Gaiseric, who captured Valentinian's widow, Licinia Eudoxia, and two of his daughters, Eudocia and Placidia. The Western Roman army gradually became increasingly reliant on barbarian mercenaries. After Valentinian's murder, the most powerful barbarian generals, such as Ricimer, became politically dominant, ruling through proclaiming puppet emperors. In the time between the death of Valentinian and the accession of Julius Nepos, a period of less than twenty years, seven different emperors ruled the west and effective imperial control was only exercised in Italy, Raetia and some regions of Gaul.

Ancestry and family 

Julius Nepos was a native of the Roman province of Dalmatia. Dalmatia, although politically, economically and geographically oriented towards the Western Roman Empire, had formally been under the authority of the Eastern Roman Empire since 437, when the western emperor Valentinian III had ceded it to the east. In practical terms, the province was often more or less autonomous. Nepos was the son of Nepotianus (died 465), a general who served under the western emperor Majorian (457–461). Nepos may have been part of a prominent local Roman family in Dalmatia. This is supported by memorial inscriptions from four roughly contemporary individuals; Aelia Nepotes, Aelia Nepos, another Julius Nepos and Nepotes, having been identified from Dalmatia.

Nepos' uncle Marcellinus was a prominent late Roman general, having fought the Vandals in several campaigns and playing a notable role in momentarily fending off Vandal attempts at controlling Sardinia. In 461, after the murder of emperor Majorian by Ricimer, Marcellinus appears to have planned to invade Italy to depose Ricimer's puppet emperor Libius Severus (461–465), but he was dissuaded from this course of action by the eastern emperor Leo I. Nepos married a Roman noblewoman whose name is not recorded, but who was related to the eastern empress Verina, possibly a niece of Leo I.

By the time of his death, Marcellinus had been a semi-autonomous governor in Dalmatia, and after his death, Nepos inherited this position. Nepos might have held this position until he became emperor in 474, by which point he had also become a patrician.

Appointment 
After the death of the western emperor Anthemius (467–472) as well as his successor Olybrius (472), who had not been recognised in the east, Leo I, the sole remaining Roman emperor, maintained that he had the right to select the new western emperor. Angered by this, Leo appointed Nepos as the commander of an army to attack Italy and depose Glycerius. Why Leo waited so long to appoint Nepos is not known, but by this time the winter meant that Nepos could not take action against Glycerius for a few months. By appointing Nepos to lead the invasion, Leo not only sought to assert his authority in the west but perhaps also hoped to rid himself of a possible rival in the east. After the political situation in Constantinople had stabilised sufficiently in the aftermath of Leo I's death on 18 January 474, Nepos left for Italy in the spring of 474, with the backing of the new eastern emperor Zeno.

Reign

Emperor in Italy (474–475) 

On 24 June, having deposed Glycerius, Nepos was proclaimed the western Augustus in Rome. Nepos thus accomplished the exact intervention into Italy that had been planned by his uncle Marcellinus some years prior. Nepos was the last emperor to be crowned in Rome until the coronation of Charlemagne in 800. Glycerius put up no resistance against Nepos, and his life was spared, being consecrated as bishop of Salona, the provincial capital of Dalmatia. It is not clear if Nepos becoming emperor had been the eastern plan, but in any event, he was swiftly recognised as the legitimate western emperor by Zeno.

Few records of Nepos' reign survive, and little is known of his activities. He is known to have issued coins throughout Italy, such as at Rome, Ravenna and Mediolanum. Coinage minted in northern Gaul in his name indicates that his rule was accepted by the Roman general Syagrius, who ruled a more or less autonomous province of his own there. Nepos also issued symbolic coins of Zeno and his junior colleague Leo II, indicating his close ties and gratitude to the eastern court.

Nepos worked to restore imperial prestige. Through his initial efforts, a Visigothic attack on Italy appears to have been repelled and the Burgundians were once again made into foederati (barbarian allies of the empire). It appears that Nepos mainly directed his efforts to attempting to restore and consolidate imperial authority in Gaul. The remaining imperial territories in Gaul were at the time being invaded by Euric, king of the Visigoths, who hoped to take control of the province Aquitania Prima. To combat the threat, Nepos appointed Ecdicius, a son of the former western emperor Avitus (455–456) as patrician and magister militum. Per the surviving writings of contemporary Gallo-Roman authors, such as Sidonius Apollinaris, Nepos' accession was enthusiastically accepted in the remaining imperial possessions in Gaul. Ecdicius successfully managed to relieve a Visigothic siege of Arles in 474. Still, he was less successful in 475 as there simply were not enough remaining military resources to achieve victory. Even after Ecdicius had proven unable to defeat the Visigoths, the threat of imperial invasion made Euric willing to negotiate with Nepos. In the spring of 475, Nepos sent as his ambassadors to Euric a group of Roman bishops, which included Epiphanius of Pavia, who had previously brokered peace between Ricimer and emperor Anthemius. Although Epiphanius and his delegation apparently achieved peace, a second delegation was sent later in 475, consisting of the bishops Leontius of Arles, Faustus of Riez, Graecus of Marseilles, and Basilius of Aix, possibly tasked with working out the concrete terms of the peace treaty. The Romans in Gaul, including Sidonius Apollinaris, were shocked to learn that the peace had involved ceding the Auvergne region to the Visigoths in turn for them leaving the rest of what remained under imperial control in Gaul alone. Nepos' failure to actually defeat the Visigoths, combined with Zeno being overthrown in Constantinople in early 475 by the usurper Basiliscus, weakened Nepos' position, which had been shaky in Italy from the very beginning.

In his foreign policy Nepos also had to deal with the Vandals, who ruled North Africa, and their renewed and increased pirate attacks throughout the Mediterranean. Because of the weak position of the western empire, there was little else Nepos could do than to recognise the Vandal rule over the territories they had already taken in Africa and throughout the Mediterranean, such as the islands of Sardinia, Corsica and the Balearics, as well as parts of Sicily.

Nepos tasked Orestes with again leading an army against the Visigoths, and against the Burgundians, who were rebelling, in southern Gaul. Orestes' army included many foederati ally troops, and Orestes learnt that they were upset with the emperor, who had refused their requests to be granted land. With the backing of this army, Orestes betrayed Nepos' orders and instead marched on Ravenna, the capital of the western empire. Hoping to maintain control, Nepos recalled Ecdicius from Gaul, but he was unable to arrive in time. On 28 August 475, Orestes entered Ravenna with his army, and Nepos escaped across the Adriatic Sea to Salona in Dalmatia, having ruled in Italy for only 14 months. On 31 October, Orestes proclaimed his young son, Romulus Augustulus, as emperor.

Exile in Dalmatia (475–480) 

Little is known of Nepos' later activities in Dalmatia due to the scarcity of surviving sources. Nepos never renounced his claim to the western empire and continued to be recognised in the east instead of Romulus Augustulus. Throughout his time in exile, Nepos hoped to regain control of Italy. On 4 September 476, Romulus Augustulus was deposed by the barbarian general Odoacer, who became the first king of Italy. Odoacer sent Romulus' western imperial regalia to Zeno in the east, and swore allegiance to him, ruling without further imperial successors in the west. Odoacer considered the Roman Empire from this point on as only requiring a single emperor, ruling from Constantinople. At the same time, an embassy from Nepos arrived in Constantinople, congratulating Zeno on regaining Constantinople from Basiliscus and requesting his assistance in restoring Nepos to power in Italy. Zeno responded to the ambassadors sent by Odoacer, members of the Roman Senate, that they had killed one east-supported emperor (Anthemius) and driven one out (Nepos) and that they would do well in receiving Nepos back as their ruler. Zeno also stated that Odoacer would do best in receiving the rank of patrician, which he had requested, not from Zeno, but from the legal western ruler, Nepos, although Zeno promised to grant the rank if Nepos would not. Zeno also urged Odoacer to accept Nepos back as emperor in Italy. Although Zeno and Verina, who remained influential at court, officially supported Nepos' restoration and continued to regard him as the western emperor, he was not granted the necessary military support or funding to retake Italy.

Odoacer only nominally accepted Nepos' rule, minting coins in the names of Nepos and Zeno in Italy and perhaps providing Nepos with a pension, and in practice ignored him. In 477 or 478, Nepos again petitioned Zeno to help him retake Italy. Also in 477, some of the remaining imperial possessions in southern Gaul rebelled against Odoacer, probably intending to fight for the restoration of Nepos. Zeno received embassies from both Odoacer and Gaul, but was forced to support Odoacer given that supporting the Gallic rebels against Odoacer would have amounted to declaring war on Odoacer, which Zeno was not prepared to do.

In 479, Nepos' hopes may have been ignited when Theodoric, the king of the Ostrogoths, offered to pledge his troops to fight for Nepos' claim. Nepos was murdered on 9 May 480, at his villa near Salona, possibly the same building as Diocletian's Palace, by members of his retinue, the  Ovida and Viator. It is possible that the former emperor Glycerius, whom Nepos had deposed, also played a leading role in the murder, possibly as the instigator. If Glycerius was not the instigator, it is possible that the murder was caused by Nepos in 480 actively beginning to prepare his forces for a real attempt at recovering Italy militarily, and that his supporters in Dalmatia were unwilling to embark on such an adventure. Though the chroniclers of the time wrote of Nepos' violent and unexpected death, it was given little attention and no actions were taken against his murderers for quite some time. Only in late 481 or 482 did Odoacer invade Dalmatia and put Ovida, who had become the ruler of the province, to death, using Nepos' murder as a convenient pretext to conquer the province for himself, a move that was indirectly acknowledged by the eastern empire given that there was no attempt to stop him. After Nepos' death, Odoacer recognised Zeno as his new suzerain and Zeno did not appoint a new western emperor, becoming the first proper sole Roman emperor of the entire empire since the death of Theodosius I in 395 (though he continued to only effectively control the eastern provinces).

Legacy 
Nepos' successor in Italy, Romulus Augustulus, is typically regarded as the last western Roman emperor, though several historians argue that this distinction is better applied to Nepos, given that he continued to rule in Dalmatia with the imperial title and the full recognition, albeit not full military support, of the eastern empire until he was murdered in 480. Romulus Augustulus by strange coincidence shares the name of both the founder of Rome (Romulus) and its first emperor (Augustus), which may, in addition to being the last western emperor to rule Italy, have contributed to him being viewed as the last emperor over Nepos. Nepos shares a similar coincidence, in that he shares his first name, Julius, with Julius Caesar, Augustus' adoptive father and predecessor as authoritarian ruler of the Roman state.

By the time of Nepos' death in 480, the Western Roman Empire was gone, and Nepos had, in the words of the Roman historian Ralph W. Mathisen, become an "unwanted anachronism"; a hindrance to Odoacer who wished to expand into Dalmatia himself and an embarrassment to Zeno, who could not offer him his full support. Though his death was seen as marking the end of the line of emperors in the west, it was barely acknowledged at the time. By the 6th century, eastern Roman historians no longer recognised Nepos' reign in Dalmatia from 475 to 480 as a legitimate continuation of his imperial reign: the 6th-century eastern historians Marcellinus Comes, Procopius and Jordanes all considered Romulus Augustulus to have been the last western emperor.

See also
 List of Roman emperors

Notes

References

Bibliography 
 

 

 

 
 
 

 
 
 
 

5th-century births
480 deaths
5th-century murdered monarchs
5th-century Roman emperors
Deaths by stabbing in Croatia
House of Leo
Nepos
Murdered Roman emperors
Year of birth uncertain